The historic divisions of County Wicklow consist of the six Baronies of Arklow, Ballinacor North, Ballinacor South, Talbotstown Lower, Talbotstown Upper, Newcastle, Rathdown and Shillelagh. The six baronies contain the following civil parishes:

See also
 List of townlands of County Wicklow
 List of baronies of Ireland
 List of civil parishes of Ireland

References

County Wicklow-related lists
 
Wicklow baronies